José Manuel Tomás Valdominos (born 12 March 1970), known as Josete, is a Spanish former footballer who played as a left back, and later worked as a manager.

Career

Josete was born in Huesca in the autonomous community of Aragon, but the left-footed defender began his career with Telde in the Canary Islands. After brief spells there and with Peralta, he joined Rayo Vallecano in the Segunda División in late 1990. He made 36 appearances for the club during the 1991–92 season, in which they finished as Segunda División runners-up and earned promotion to La Liga. He continued to play a key role for the two top flight campaigns that followed, in the second of which Rayo were relegated following a relegation playoff loss to Compostela.

Josete was able to stay in the top division by joining Real Betis, where he was a regular in the starting lineup for two years, including featuring in their 1995–96 UEFA Cup campaign. In 1996–97 he played only nine matches, and the arrival of Luis Aragonés as head coach ahead of the following season made matters worse. Josete managed only two appearances, and left for Deportivo Alavés that summer. He played just twenty league matches in two and half seasons with Alavés, before joining Lleida in January 2001. Lleida were relegated from the second tier at the end of that season, and Josete stayed with the club in Segunda División B until retiring in 2003 at the age of 33.

Retirement

After his retirement, Josete continued to live in Lleida, and began a brief coaching career, working with Binéfar in the Tercera División and Almudévar in the Regional Preferente de Aragón. He then left football, becoming an entrepreneur and opening a coffee shop.

Honours
Rayo Vallecano
Segunda División runners-up: 1991–92

Real Betis
Copa del Rey runners-up: 1996–97

Career statistics

1. Appearances in the 1993–94 La Liga relegation playoff
2. Appearances in the 1995–96 UEFA Cup
3. Appearance in the 1997–98 UEFA Cup Winners' Cup

References

External links

1970 births
Living people
Spanish footballers
People from Huesca
Sportspeople from the Province of Huesca
Association football defenders
La Liga players
Segunda División players
Segunda División B players
Tercera División players
Rayo Vallecano players
Real Betis players
Deportivo Alavés players
UE Lleida players
Spanish football managers
Tercera División managers
CD Binéfar managers